Cladding is an outer layer of material covering another. It may refer to the following:

Cladding (boiler), the layer of insulation and outer wrapping around a boiler shell
Cladding (construction), materials applied to the exterior of buildings
Wall cladding, exterior material applied to the walls of a building
Copper cladding, applying copper to the exterior of buildings
Rainscreen cladding, an exterior wall detail to create a capillary break and to allow drainage and evaporation of water
Cladding (fiber optics), fiber optics property to contain light in the core of the fiber by total internal reflection 
Cladding (metalworking), a bonding together of dissimilar metals
Cladding (nuclear fuel), the outer layer of the fuel rods, standing between the coolant and the nuclear fuel

See also 
CLAD (disambiguation)